Eggplant is a dark purple or brownish-purple color that resembles the color of the outer skin of European eggplants. Another name for the color eggplant is aubergine (the French, German and British English word for eggplant).

The first recorded use of eggplant as a color name in English was in 1915.

The pinkish-purple-grayish color shown in the color box as eggplant was introduced by Crayola in 1998.

Different varieties of eggplant may range from indigo to white (the term eggplant originated as a description of white colored eggplants because they look like eggs).  Chinese eggplants are the same shape as a European eggplant, but are colored a dark violet color.  Thai eggplants are small, round, and colored forest green.

Purple is a more used term.

References

Quaternary colors
Shades of violet
Shades of magenta
Shades of brown